Paramesotriton guangxiensis, the Guangxi warty newt, is a species of salamander in the family Salamandridae. It is found only in China: it is only known from Paiyangshan, Ningming County, in Guangxi Province. Its natural habitats are subtropical or tropical moist lowland forests and rivers. It is threatened by habitat loss.

References

guangxiensis
Endemic fauna of China
Amphibians of China
Taxonomy articles created by Polbot
Amphibians described in 1983